Events in the year 1591 in Norway.

Incumbents
Monarch: Christian IV

Events
31 July – The Sorenskriver office is introduced in Norway.

Arts and literature
 The oldest document with the seal of Stavanger city coat of arms is made.

Births

Deaths

2 November - Frants Berg, bishop (born 1504 ?).

See also

References